Skeets may refer to:

People
 Skeets Gallacher (1925–2013), British boxer
 Richard "Skeets" Gallagher (1891–1955), American actor
 Skeets Herfurt (1911–1992), American jazz saxophonist and clarinetist
 Skeets Martin (1875–1944), American jockey
 Skeets McDonald (1915–1968), American country and rockabilly musician
 William Burke Miller (1904–1983), American newspaper and radio reporter
 Skeets Quinlan (1928–1998), American National Football League player
 Skeets Tolbert (1909–2000), American jazz musician

Other uses
 Skeets (DC Comics), a fictional robot

See also

Skeet (disambiguation)
Skeeter (disambiguation)

Lists of people by nickname